Hasmukh Patel may refer to:
Hasmukh Patel (architect)
Hasmukh Patel (politician)